Seeing and Doing is a 2005 EP by Christ.

Track listing
 "Fragile X"
 "Marsh of Epidemics"
 "Magic Piano"
 "Alter Boy"
 "Marsh of Epidemics (Alias Remix)"

Christ. (musician) albums
2005 EPs
Electronica EPs